Wilfred Norman Edwards FGS (13 June 1890 – 17 December 1956) was a British geologist, keeper of geology at the Natural History Museum from 1938 to 1955 and was awarded the Lyell Medal in 1955.

References

1890 births
1956 deaths
20th-century British geologists
Fellows of the Geological Society of London
Employees of the Natural History Museum, London
Lyell Medal winners